Lilium wallichianum is an Asian species of bulbous plants in the lily family native to the Indian Subcontinent and to Myanmar. It is native to India, as well as Nepal, Bhutan, and Myanmar.

The bulbs are stoloniferous, with new bulbs capable of appearing some distance from the parent plant. A fairly difficult species to grow successfully in the garden, it requires a moist slightly acidic soil with excellent drainage. The species prefers light dappled shade and blooms very late in the season.

The species was named for Dr. Nathaniel Wallich (1786 – 1854), Danish plant hunter, botanist and physician.

Varieties
 Lilium wallichianum var. neilgherrense (Wight) H.Hara - Nepal, Karnataka and Kerala in southern India
 Lilium wallichianum var. wallichianum - Himalayas

References

wallichianum
Flora of the Indian subcontinent
Plants described in 1830